Korkeasaari is an island in Helsinki. The literal meaning of Korkeasaari is "Tall Island/Islet". It is part of the Mustikkamaa–Korkeasaari district. Korkeasaari Zoo is located on the island and named after it. 

The island of Korkeasaari is a  rocky island. Two smaller islands are located next to it: Hylkysaari and Palosaari.

History
A sacrificial stone from the Bronze Age has been found on the island. It is the first one found in the Helsinki area. 

Korkeasaari has been in recreational use for people living in Helsinki for a long time. Locals used it for fishing and for herding. After the Crimean War a steam boat started operating to the island, and the island became a popular place to spend time. 

Korkeasaari was rented to Helsingin Anniskelyhtiö in 1883, and the company started renovating the island. Roads were built and city gardener L. A. Jernström planned planting areas to the island. A restaurant designed by Theodor Höijer was built in 1884, and it is still located on the island and used as a restaurant. In 1889 Korkeasaari Zoo was established and located to the island.

Transportation
In 1972, a bridge was built to connect Korkeasaari to the mainland via Mustikkamaa. Before that, a ferry was the only option to arrive to the island. A ferry still operates to Korkeasaari from the Market Square during the summer. In August 2016, planning of Kruunusillat bridges started. They will connect Korkeasaari to Hakaniemi and Kruunuvuorenranta, and also bring a tram connection to the island.

Gallery

References

Parks in Helsinki
Islands of Helsinki
Islands of Uusimaa